The Château de La Celle, also named Château de La Celle Saint-Cloud or the Petit Château, is a historical building located in the commune of La Celle-Saint-Cloud, in the French département of Yvelines (France), south-west suburbs of Paris,  north of Versailles. It is owned by the Ministère des Affaires étrangères, the French Foreign Office.

Châteaux in Yvelines